Thielmann is a German surname. Notable people with the name include:
 Johann von Thielmann (1765–1824), Saxon cavalry general
 Jan Thielmann (born 2002), German professional footballer
 Greg Thielmann (A. Gregory Thielmann), arms control specialist

See also 
 Thielman
 Thielemann
 Thiemann

German-language surnames